Zblęg  is a village in the administrative district of Gmina Osięciny, within Radziejów County, Kuyavian-Pomeranian Voivodeship, in north-central Poland.

The village has a population of 40.

References

Villages in Radziejów County